The 18th century BC was the century that lasted from 1800 BC to 1701 BC.

Events

1800 BC: Iron Age in India
1800 BC: Beginning of the Nordic Bronze Age in the period system devised by Oscar Montelius.
 c. 1800 BC: Sedentary Mayan communities in Mesoamerica
 c. 1800 BC: Hyksos start to settle in the Nile Delta. They had the capital at Avaris in northeastern Nile Delta.
 1800 BC:		Adichanallur urn-burial site in Tirunelveli district in Tamil Nadu. In 2004, a number of skeletons dating from around 3,800 years ago.
 1800 BC:	Beginning of the Indo-Aryan migration
1800 BC – 1700 BC: Decline of the Indus Valley civilisation
1800 BC – 1300 BC: Troy VI flourishes.
c. 1792 BC – 1750 BC: (middle chronology) – Hammurabi rules Babylonia and has to deal with Mari, which he conquers late in his career.
c. 1792 BC – 1750 BC: (middle chronology) – Stela of Hammurabi, from Susa (modern Shush, Iran) is made. It is now in Musée du Louvre, Paris.
1787 BC – 1784 BC: Amorite conquests of Uruk and Isin.
1786 BC: Egypt: Queen Sobekneferu dies. End of Twelfth Dynasty, start of Thirteenth Dynasty, start of Fourteenth Dynasty.
1779 BC: Zimrilim, the King of Mari, starts to rule.
1770 BC: Babylon, capital of Babylonia becomes the largest city of the world, taking the lead from Thebes, capital of Egypt.
1766 BC: Shang conquest of Xia Dynasty. China.
1764 BC – 1750 BC: Wars of Hammurabi.
1757 BC: Mari sacked by Hammurabi. Zimrilim's palace is destroyed.
1757 BC: Zimrilim, the King of Mari, dies.
1750 BC: Hyksos occupation of Northern Egypt.
1750 BC: A colossal volcanic eruption at Mount Veniaminof, Alaska.
c. 1750 BC: Vedic period starts in India.
c. 1750 BC: Investiture of Zimrilim (Zimrilim, King of Mari, before the Goddess Ishtar), facsimile of a wall painting on mud plaster from the Zimrilim palace at Mari (modern Tell Hariri, Syria), Court 106, is made. It is now in Musée du Louvre, Paris.
c. 1740–1720 BC: reigns of pharaoh Neferhotep I and his brother Sobekhotep IV, marking the apex of the Egyptian 13th Dynasty.
1749 BC – 1712 BC: Mesopotamian Rebellions.
Early Unetice culture, beginning of the Bronze Age in Central Europe.
Minoan civilization: phase II of the Middle period (MM II).
c. 1700 BC:  The last species of mammoth became extinct on Wrangel Island.
c. 1700 BC: Indus Valley civilization comes to an end but is continued by the Cemetery H culture
c. 1700 BC: Minoan Old Palace period ends and Minoan Second Palace (Neopalatial) period starts in Crete.
c. 1700 BC: Aegean metalworkers are producing decorative objects rivaling those of Ancient Near East jewelers, whose techniques they seem to borrow.
c. 1700 BC: Lila-Ir-Tash started to rule the Elamite Empire.
c. 1700 BC: Bronze Age starts in China.
c. 1700 BC: Shang Dynasty starts in China.

Deaths

1750 BC—Hammurabi (middle chronology)

1764 BC Yarim Lim 1 The Great King of Yamhad

Inventions, discoveries, introductions
c. 1700 BC—Median date for the building of the Phaistos Disc. Its purpose and meaning, and even its original geographical place of manufacture remains unknown, making it one of the most famous mysteries of archaeology.

Sovereign states

References

 

 
-2
-82